Best Friends? is the fourth studio album by the American rock band Brad. It was recorded in 2003 after the band's return from an Australian tour. It was released on August 10, 2010, through Monkeywrench, Inc.

Track listing

Personnel

Brad
Stone Gossard – guitars, painting
Regan Hagar – drums, package design
Shawn Smith – vocals, piano, organ
Mike Berg – bass guitar

Additional musicians and production
Barrett Jones – Mixing
Brad – production
Ed Brooks at RFI – mastering
Kevin Wood – additional guitar 
Lonnie Marshall – additional bass guitar
Anna Knowlden – photos
Floyd Reitsma – assistance, engineering

References

2010 albums
Brad (band) albums